The Ashkelon rocket attacks were a series of rocket attacks from Gaza initiated by the ISIL affiliate Sheikh Omar Hadid Brigade in 2015.

Events
After the first rocket attacks on June 2 and 7 by Sheikh Omar Hadid Brigade, they claimed responsibility for another attack on June 11 however Israeli intelligence asserts the June 11th attack was actually carried out by Palestinian Islamic Jihad. On June 6 the Israeli Airforce carried out airstrikes targeting Hamas. After the June 11th rocket attack on June 23rd rockets were fired into Hof Ashkelon and soon after the Israeli Airforce conducted another airstrike. Five days later on June 28 sirens sounded around Hof Ashkelon and another rocket was fired.

In July one rocket was fired into Hof Ashkelon from Gaza and exploded, Israel soon after launched airstrikes targeting Hamas.

There were no attacks on Ashkelon or in Hof Ashkelon in August, however in September 2015 attacks resumed. On September 18 a rocket exploded in Sderot which damaged a house and a bus. Later on the same day a rocket fired from Gaza was intercepted by Iron Dome over Ashkelon. On September 21 Sheikh Omar Hadid Brigade fired a Grad rocket into Ashkelon.

References

Ashkelon
Islamic terrorist incidents in 2015
Rocket artillery
June 2015 events in Asia
July 2015 events in Asia
August 2015 events in Asia
September 2015 events in Asia
Terrorist incidents in Israel in 2015
Military operations of the Israeli–Palestinian conflict